Auxentius of Mopsuestia (died 360) was bishop of Mopsuestia and a saint in the Eastern Orthodox and Roman Catholic churches.  His feast day is December 18. Baronius places Auxentius in the Roman Martyrology, because of the story told by Philostorgius (in the Suda) that he was at one time an officer in the army of Licinius, and gave up his commission rather than obey the imperial command to lay a bunch of grapes at the feet of a statue of Bacchus. Tillemont is inclined to believe that Auxentius was an Arian; his patronage of the heretic Aetius, points to this conclusion.

He is not to be confused with Auxentius (d. 374), bishop of Milan, or with Saint Auxentius (d. 473), a hermit cleared of heresy at the Council of Chalcedon and an Eastern Orthodox and Roman Catholic saint.

Notes

360 deaths
4th-century bishops in Roman Anatolia
Byzantine saints
Saints from Roman Anatolia
4th-century Christian saints
Year of birth unknown